The 1996 ECAC Hockey Men's Ice Hockey Tournament was the 35th tournament in league history. It was played between March 5 and March 16, 1996. Preliminary and quarterfinal games were played at home team campus sites, while the 'final four' games were played at the Olympic Arena (subsequently renamed Herb Brooks Arena) in Lake Placid, New York. By winning the tournament, Cornell received the ECAC's automatic bid to the 1996 NCAA Division I Men's Ice Hockey Tournament.

Format
The tournament featured four rounds of play. The two teams that finish below tenth place in the standings are not eligible for tournament play. In the preliminary round, the seventh and tenth seeds and the eighth and ninth seeds each play a single game to determine the final qualifying teams for the quarterfinals. In the quarterfinals the first seed and lower ranked qualifier, the second and higher ranked qualifier, the third seed and sixth seed and the fourth seed and fifth seed played a modified best-of-three series, where the first team to receive 3 points moves on. After the opening round every series becomes a single-elimination game. In the semifinals, the highest seed plays the lowest remaining seed while the two remaining teams play with the winners advancing to the championship game and the losers advancing to the third place game. The tournament champion receives an automatic bid to the 1996 NCAA Division I Men's Ice Hockey Tournament.

Conference standings
Note: GP = Games played; W = Wins; L = Losses; T = Ties; PTS = Points; GF = Goals For; GA = Goals Against

Bracket
Teams are reseeded after the first two rounds

Note: * denotes overtime period(s)

Preliminary round

(7) Brown vs. (10) Princeton

(8) Rensselaer vs. (9) Dartmouth

Quarterfinals

(1) Vermont vs. (8) Rensselaer

(2) Clarkson vs. (7) Brown

(3) St. Lawrence vs. (6) Harvard

(4) Cornell vs. (5) Colgate

Semifinals

(1) Vermont vs. (6) Harvard

(2) Clarkson vs. (4) Cornell

Third place

(1) Vermont vs. (2) Clarkson

Championship

(4) Cornell vs. (6) Harvard

Tournament awards

All-Tournament Team
F Mike Sancimino (Cornell)
F Martin St. Louis (Vermont)
F Tommy Holmes (Harvard)
D Steve Wilson (Cornell)
D Jeremiah McCarthy (Harvard)
G Jason Elliott* (Cornell)
* Most Outstanding Player(s)

References

External links
ECAC Hockey
1995–96 ECAC Hockey Standings
1995–96 NCAA Standings

ECAC Hockey Men's Ice Hockey Tournament
ECAC tournament